The following is a list of national and international statistical services.

Central national statistical services
Nearly every country in the world has set a central public sector unit entirely devoted to the production, harmonisation and dissemination of official statistics that the public sector and the national community need to run, monitor and evaluate their operations and policies. This central statistical organisation does not produce every official statistic as other public sector organisations, like the national central bank or ministries in charge of agriculture, education or health, may be charged with producing and disseminating sector policy oriented statistical data. The statistical legislation and regulation generally attribute responsibilities and authorities according to statistical domains or functions in addition to those of the central unit.

The table below lists these central statistical organisations by country. The United States has no central producing unit, but several units (also listed below) have been given responsibility over various federal statistics domains (see also: Federal Statistical System of the United States).

Africa

Americas

Asia

Europe
(Institutions from countries marked with * are members of Eurostat's European Statistical System (ESS).)

Oceania

Autonomous statistical services at sub-national level
Some countries are politically organised as federations of states or of autonomous regions; also a specific territory might have been given a partial autonomy. Several of these sub-national regional units have set their own quasi-independent statistical department. A list is presented in Sub-national autonomous statistical services

International statistical services

United Nations organisations

Intergovernmental Development and Central Banks

Regional intergovernmental organisations

Other organisations

See also

 Official statistics
 Statistics
 List of statistical topics
 List of academic statistical associations
 National agencies responsible for GDP measurement

External links
 World Bank directory of national statistic sites
 OECD Worldwide statistical sources
 UN Statistics Division Information on National Statistical Systems

 
Demography
Lists of government agencies
Official statistics
Statistics-related lists
Government institutions

de:Statistischer Dienst